Anthaxia lucens is a species of jewel beetle belonging to the family Buprestidae, subfamily Buprestinae.

Subspecies
 Anthaxia lucens lucens Küster, 1852 
 Anthaxia lucens phoenica Ganglbauer, 1882

Descriptiom
This species has a bright elytral coloration, with longitudinal orange stripes on a metallic bluish-black background. Male's  metatibiae are almost straight. Larvae feed on Prunus domestica, Armeniaca vulgaris and Prunus cerasus.

Distribution
This species is present in the East Palearctic ecozone, in Albania, Crete, Croatia, Greece, Italy, Montenegro and Turkey.

References 

Buprestidae
Beetles of Europe
Beetles described in 1852